Bharuhana is a census town in Mirzapur district  in the state of Uttar Pradesh, India.

Demographics
 India census, Bharuhana had a population of 5,734. Males constitute 54% of the population and females 46%. Bharuhana has an average literacy rate of 56%, lower than the national average of 59.5%; with male literacy of 65% and female literacy of 44%. 15% of the population is under 6 years of age.

References

Cities and towns in Mirzapur district